Garth Vernon Boesch (October 7, 1920 – May 14, 1998) was a Canadian ice hockey defenceman who played in the National Hockey League with the Toronto Maple Leafs between 1946 and 1950. He won the Stanley Cup three times with Toronto, from 1947 to 1959.

Playing career
Boesch played four seasons with the Toronto Maple Leafs and was a member of three Stanley Cup winning teams in 1947, 1948 and 1949. He died of heart disease at the age of 77 on May 14, 1998.

Career statistics

Regular season and playoffs

Awards and achievements
1948 NHL All Star
1949 NHL All Star

External links
 
 Picture of Garth Boesch's Name on the 1949 Stanley Cup Plaque

1920 births
1998 deaths
Canadian expatriates in the United States
Canadian ice hockey defencemen
Ice hockey people from Saskatchewan
Notre Dame Hounds players
Pittsburgh Hornets players
Stanley Cup champions
Toronto Maple Leafs players